Alleluia (derived from the Hebrew Hallelujah, meaning "Praise Yahweh") is a Latin phrase in Christianity used to give praise to God. In Christian worship, Alleluia is used as a liturgical chant in which that word is combined with verses of scripture, usually from the Psalms. This chant is commonly used before the proclamation of the Gospel. In Western Christianity, congregations commonly cease using the word "Alleluia" during the period of Lent but restore it into their services at Easter. The form of praise "Alleluia" is used by Christians to thank and glorify God; it finds itself present in many prayers and hymns, especially those related to Eastertide, such as Jesus Christ Is Risen Today.

History
The Hebrew word Hallelujah as an expression of praise to God was preserved, untranslated, by the Early Christians as a superlative expression of thanksgiving, joy, and triumph. Thus it appears in the ancient Greek Liturgy of St. James, which is still used to this day by the Patriarch of Jerusalem and, in its Syriac recension is the prototype of that used by the Maronites. In the Liturgy of St. Mark, apparently the most ancient of all, we find this rubric: "Then follow let us attend, the Apostle, and the Prologue of the Alleluia." The "Apostle" is the usual ancient Eastern title for the Epistle reading, and the "Prologue of the Alleluia" would seem to be a prayer or verse before Alleluia was sung by the choir. It has been suggested that the acclamation arises from and is an onomatopoeic rendition of the ancient tradition of ululation.

Eastern uses

Byzantine Rite

In the Eastern Orthodox, as well as Byzantine Rite Eastern Catholic and Eastern Lutheran Churches, after reading the Apostle (Epistle) at the Divine Liturgy, the Reader announces which of the Eight Tones the Alleluia is to be chanted in. The response of the choir is always the same: "Alleluia, alleluia, alleluia." What differs is the tone in which it is sung, and the stichera (psalm verses) which are intoned by the Reader.

The Alleluia is paired with the Prokeimenon which preceded the reading of the Apostle. There may be either one or two Alleluias, depending upon the number of Prokeimena (there may be up to three readings from the Apostle, but never be more than two Prokeimena and Alleluia).

In the Russian/Slavic order, the Alleluia is intoned in one of the two following manners, depending upon the number of Prokeimena (The Antiochian/Byzantine practice is slightly different):

One Alleluia
Deacon: "Let us attend."
Reader: "Alleluia in the  Tone."
Choir: "Alleluia, alleluia, alleluia."
The Reader then chants the first sticheron of the Alleluia.
Choir: "Alleluia, alleluia, alleluia."
The Reader then chants the second sticheron of the Alleluia.
Choir: "Alleluia, alleluia, alleluia."

Two Alleluias
Deacon: "Let us attend."
Reader: "Alleluia in the  Tone:" Then he immediately chants the first sticheron of the first Alleluia.
Choir: "Alleluia, alleluia, alleluia."
The Reader then chants the second sticheron of the first Alleluia.
Choir: "Alleluia, alleluia, alleluia."
Reader: "In the  Tone:" And he chants the first sticheron of the second Alleluia.
Choir: "Alleluia, alleluia, alleluia."

Lenten Alleluia
Among the Orthodox, the chanting of Alleluia does not cease during Lent, as it does in the West. This is in accordance with the Orthodox approach to fasting, which is one of sober joy. During the weekdays of Great Lent and certain days during the lesser Lenten seasons (Nativity Fast, Apostles' Fast, and Dormition Fast), the celebration of the Divine Liturgy on weekdays is not permitted. Instead, Alleluia is chanted at Matins. Since this chanting of Alleluia at Matins is characteristic of Lenten services, Lenten days are referred to as "Days with Alleluia."

The Alleluia at Matins is not related to scripture readings or Prokeimena; instead, it replaces "God is the Lord..." It is sung in the Tone of the Week and is followed by the Hymns to the Trinity (Triadica) in the same tone (see Octoechos for an explanation of the eight-week cycle of tones).

"God is the Lord..." would normally be intoned by the deacon, but since the deacon does not serve on days with Alleluia, it is intoned by the priest. He stands in front of the icon of Christ on the Iconostasis, and says:

Priest: "Alleluia in the  Tone: Out of the night my spirit waketh at dawn unto Thee, O God, for Thy commandments are a light upon the earth."
Choir: "Alleluia, alleluia, alleluia."
Priest: "Learn righteousness, ye that dwell upon the earth."
Choir: "Alleluia, alleluia, alleluia."
Priest: "Zeal shall lay hold upon an uninstructed people."
Choir: "Alleluia, alleluia, alleluia."
Priest: "Add more evils upon them, O Lord, lay more evils upon them that are glorious upon the earth."
Choir: "Alleluia, alleluia, alleluia."

Alleluia for the departed
Alleluia is also chanted to a special melody at funerals, memorial services (Greek: Parastas, Slavonic: Panikhida), and on Saturdays of the Dead. Again, it is chanted in place of "God is the Lord...", but this time is followed by the Troparia of the Departed.

The Alleluia is intoned by the deacon (or the priest, if no deacon is available):

Deacon: "Alleluia, in the 8th tone: Blessed are they whom Thou hast chosen and taken unto Thyself, O Lord."
Choir: "Alleluia, Alleluia, Alleluia."
Deacon: "Their memory is from generation to generation."
Choir: "Alleluia, Alleluia, Alleluia."
Deacon: "Their souls will dwell amid good things."
Choir: "Alleluia, Alleluia, Alleluia."

On Saturdays of the Dead, which are celebrated several times throughout the year, the prokeimenon at Vespers is also replaced with Alleluia, which is chanted in the following manner:

Deacon: "Alleluia, in the 8th tone.
Choir: "Alleluia, Alleluia, Alleluia."
Deacon: "Blessed are they whom Thou hast chosen and taken unto Thyself, O Lord."
Choir: "Alleluia, Alleluia, Alleluia."
Deacon: "Their memory is from generation to generation."
Choir: "Alleluia, Alleluia, Alleluia."

Other uses
Gospel readings are appointed for other services as well, particularly those in the Trebnik. A number of these are preceded by an Alleluia, in the same manner as that chanted at the Divine Liturgy, though sometimes there are no stichera (psalm verses).

During the sacred mystery (Sacrament) of baptism, in addition to the Alleluia before the Gospel, the choir also chants an Alleluia while the priest pours the Oil of Catechumens into the baptismal font.

Western use

Roman Rite

In the Roman Rite the word Alleluia is associated with joy and is especially favoured in Paschal time, the time between Easter and Pentecost, perhaps because of the association of the hallel (Alleluia psalms) chanted at Passover. During this time, the word is added widely to verses and responses associated with prayers, to antiphons of psalms, and, during the Octave of Easter and on Pentecost Sunday, to the dismissal at the end of Mass ("Ite missa est").

On the other hand, the word Alleluia is excluded from the Roman liturgy during Lent, often euphemistically referred to during this time as the "A-word". In pre-1970 forms of the Roman Rite it is excluded also in the pre-Lenten Septuagesima period and in Masses for the Dead. The same word, which normally follows the Gloria Patri at the beginning of each hour of the Liturgy of the Hours and which in the present ordinary form of the Roman Rite is omitted during Lent, is replaced in pre-1970 forms by the phrase Laus tibi, Domine, rex aeternae gloriae (Praise to thee, O Lord, king of eternal glory) in Lent and the Septuagesima period.

The term Alleluia is used also to designate a chant beginning and ending with this word and including a verse of scripture, in particular a chant to greet and welcome the Lord whose word will be proclaimed in the Gospel reading. The choir or a cantor sings "Alleluia". The congregation repeats this. The choir or cantor then sings a verse taken from the Mass Lectionary or the Roman Gradual, after which the congregation again sings "Alleluia". In Lent the verse alone is sung or the word Alleluia is replaced by a different acclamation taken from the Gradual, or a tract is sung. If singing is not used, the Alleluia and its verse may be omitted at any season.<ref name=McNamara>[https://zenit.org/articles/liturgy-q-a-the-alleluia-before-the-gospel/ Edward McNamara, "LITURGY Q & A: The Alleluia Before the Gospel in ZENIT, 6 June 2017]</ref>

The complex plainchant setting in the Roman Gradual requires a high degree of skill and is mostly used only in monasteries and seminaries. This melismatic Gregorian chant opens with the cantor singing "Alleluia". The choir repeats it, adding to the final syllable a long melisma called a jubilus. (The Liber Usualis notates the repeat with the Roman numeral "ij" (2) and continues with the jubilus.) The cantor then sings the main part of the verse, and the choir joins in on the final line. The cantor then repeats the opening Alleluia, and the choir repeats only the jubilus. The music is generally ornate, but often within a narrow range. The Alleluia for Christmas Eve, for instance, has an ambitus of only a perfect fifth, a rather extreme example.

Alleluias were frequently troped, both with added music and text. It is believed that some early Sequences derived from syllabic text being added to the jubilus, and may be named after the opening words of the Alleluia verse. Alleluias were also among the more frequently used chants to create early organa, such as in the Winchester Troper.

The Alleluia and its verse is replaced during Lent and in the pre-1970 form of the Roman Rite Mass also during Septuagesima time by a Tract. On the other hand, during Eastertide the Gradual is replaced with an Alleluia chant, thus putting two such chants before the Gospel reading.

See also
 Alle Psallite Cum Luya Alleluia, dulce carmenReferences

 Hoppin, Richard. Medieval Music''. New York: Norton, 1978.

External links
 Catholic Encyclopedia article, s.v., Alleluia
 Photo—Chanting the Alleluia Russian Orthodox

Christian terminology
Death customs
Liturgy of the Hours
Masses (music)
Order of Mass